María Luisa Muñoz (born 6 May 1959) is a Spanish long-distance runner. She competed in the women's marathon at the 2000 Summer Olympics.

References

1959 births
Living people
Athletes (track and field) at the 2000 Summer Olympics
Spanish female long-distance runners
Spanish female marathon runners
Olympic athletes of Spain
Place of birth missing (living people)
People from Campiña Sur (Córdoba)
Sportspeople from the Province of Córdoba (Spain)